Fungerin is an antifungal alkaloid with the molecular formula C13H18N2O2 which is produced by Fusarium species.

References

Further reading 

 
 

Fungerin
Imidazole antifungals
Acrylate esters
Methyl esters